Gregory Adam Reynolds (born July 3, 1985) is an American former professional baseball pitcher. He played in Major League Baseball for the Colorado Rockies and the Cincinnati Reds.

Amateur career
Reynolds was drafted by the Philadelphia Phillies out of Terra Nova High School in the 41st round of the 2003 MLB Draft, but he instead decided to attend Stanford University. In 2004 and 2005, he played collegiate summer baseball with the Bourne Braves of the Cape Cod Baseball League. He was then selected by the Colorado Rockies as the second overall selection in the first round of the 2006 MLB Draft.

Professional career

Colorado Rockies

Reynolds made his Major League Baseball debut on May 11, in a 6-1 road loss against the San Diego Padres.  He allowed four earned runs on six hits and struck out one batter in 5.2 innings.

On June 7, 2008, Reynolds picked up his first career win and hit as a pitcher, in a 7-2 home victory over the Milwaukee Brewers.  He pitched six innings, allowing two earned runs on four hits, with no strikeouts. His first career hit, a double, occurred in the bottom of the second inning off Brewers pitcher Dave Bush.

In 2009, Reynolds appeared in just 1 game due to injury. In 2010, he split time between Double-A and AAA, compiling a record of 8-6 in 19 starts.

On May 22, 2011, Reynolds was called up to replace struggling Felipe Paulino. Reynolds went 3-0 for the Rockies but with an ERA of 6.19 in 13 games.

Texas Rangers
On January 5, 2012 Reynolds was traded to the Texas Rangers for Chad Tracy. He was let go after the 2012 season.

Cincinnati Reds
In 2013, Reynolds signed a minor league deal with the Cincinnati Reds. He began the season with Triple-A Louisville, where in 18 starts before his callup, he went 10-2 with a 2.54 ERA, striking out 79 in 127.1 innings. On July 23, Reynolds was called up to start the second game of a double-header against the San Francisco Giants. In his start, he went 5 innings giving up 5 runs, taking the loss. On July 28, he was designated for assignment.

Saitama Seibu Lions
In December 2013, Reynolds reached a deal with the Seibu Lions. He was released on September 20, 2014.

San Diego Padres
Reynolds was signed to a minor league contract by the San Diego Padres on February 19, 2016. He was released on May 16, 2016.

Personal life
Reynolds appeared on an episode of MythBusters titled "Battle of the Sexes: Round 2" as a professional pitcher.

References

External links

1985 births
Living people
People from Pacifica, California
Baseball players from California
Major League Baseball pitchers
Nippon Professional Baseball pitchers
Colorado Rockies players
Cincinnati Reds players
Stanford Cardinal baseball players
Colorado Springs Sky Sox players
Tulsa Drillers players
Modesto Nuts players
Round Rock Express players
Louisville Bats players
Saitama Seibu Lions players
Bourne Braves players
American expatriate baseball players in Japan